Towhidabad, also rendered as Tohidabad, may refer to:
 Towhidabad, Golestan
 Towhidabad, Kohgiluyeh and Boyer-Ahmad
 Towhidabad, Chabahar, Sistan and Baluchestan Province
 Towhidabad, Khash, Sistan and Baluchestan Province
 Towhidabad, Mirjaveh, Sistan and Baluchestan Province
 Towhidabad, Nosratabad, Sistan and Baluchestan Province